Mitra is a lunar impact crater that is attached to the western outer rim of the larger crater Mach, on the far side of the Moon. Just to the west of Mitra is Bredikhin, and to the south-southeast lies Henyey. It is named after Sisir Kumar Mitra, who was an Indian physicist and Padma Bhushan award recipient known for his pioneering work in the field of ionosphere and radiophysics.

This is a heavily eroded formation with an outer rim that has been damaged by subsequent impacts. Attached to the exterior along the southeast is the satellite crater Mitra J. A number of smaller impacts lie along the rim edge, and very little of the original rim remains intact. Within the interior, a smaller crater occupies the southwestern part of the floor, and a small, cup-shaped crater lies across the northeast rim of this formation and very close to the midpoint of Mitra. The remaining floor is marked only by a few small and tiny craterlets.

Mitra lies within the Dirichlet–Jackson Basin.

Satellite craters
By convention these features are identified on lunar maps by placing the letter on the side of the crater midpoint that is closest to Mitra.

See also
 Bose (crater)

References

 
 
 
 
 
 
 
 
 
 
 
 

Impact craters on the Moon